Changbai Shan (989) is a Type 071 amphibious transport dock of the People's Liberation Army Navy.

Development and design 

Type 071 integrated landing ship (NATO code name: Yuzhao-class) is a large dock landing ship of the Chinese People's Liberation Army Navy. It can be used as the mother ship of the air cushion landing craft to transport soldiers, infantry fighting vehicles, main battle tanks, etc. for landing operations. It can also carry amphibious vehicles, the hangar can accommodate 4 helicopters, and the deck can be used for two helicopters to take off and land.

The amphibious warfare ship features a vehicle deck, well-deck, landing deck and a hangar. It can carry a combination of marines, vehicles, landing craft and helicopters. The ship may embark 600 to 800 troops. The stern helicopter deck offers two landing spots for supporting the operations of two Z-8 (SA 321 Super Frelon) transport helicopters. The twin-door cantilever hangar can house up to four Z-8 helicopters. The well deck houses up to four Type 726 air-cushioned landing craft, which can transfer vehicles or marines to the shore at high speed. The LCAC are launched by flooding of the docking area. The vessel can also carry landing craft on port / starboard davits. The vehicle deck can house amphibious assault vehicles including the ZBD05 amphibious IFV and the ZTD-05 amphibious light tank. The stern ramp, two side doors and ramps allow rapid loading of the vehicles and equipment.

The ship is armed with one 76 mm gun and four 30 mm close-in weapon systems.

The Type 071 may operate as the flagship of a task force. the Type 071 may also conduct and support humanitarian, disaster relief, and counterpiracy missions, in addition to amphibious assaults.

Construction and career 
She was launched on 26 September 2011 at Hudong-Zhonghua Shipyard in Shanghai and commissioned on 23 September 2012 into the South Sea Fleet.

From January to February 2015, Changbai Shan and Yuncheng and Chaohu of the 18th Gulf of Aden escort fleet visited Britain, France, Germany, and the Netherlands. On January 12, the formation visited the Portsmouth Naval Port in the United Kingdom. The British Daily Mail reported on this on January 13: "Three huge warships entered the Royal Navy's home in the amazement of the crowd, but unfortunately they are Chinese warships, not British". On January 26, the formation arrived at the Port of Rotterdam in the Netherlands. They were the first Chinese navy ship to paid an official visit to the Netherlands for the first time in 43 years since the establishment of diplomatic relations between China and the Netherlands. During the docking period, a local lady asked: "Which country do you rent such a large warship? Or built it yourself?" In August 2015, Changbai Shan with other ships went to Vladivostok, Russia to participate in the "Maritime Joint-2015 (II)" Sino-Russian military exercise. On August 25, the joint landed in Russia's Peter the Great Bay began a battle. According to the pictures taken by the media, Changbai Shan released 14 amphibious marine combat vehicles, carrying 150 marines to attack the target tidal flat position.

On May 15, 2016, Changbai Shan went to Thailand to participate in the one-month "Blue Assault 2016" Sino-Thai Marine Corps joint training.

9 February 2021, the 37th escort group which consists of Yinchuan, Hengyang, Chaganhu, Wuzhi Shan and Tianshuxing participated in the Annual High Sea Joint Training Exercises.

Gallery

References

2011 ships
Type 071 amphibious transport docks
Ships built in China